Kimberly Salazar (born 24 April 2004) is a Mexican rhythmic gymnast, member of the national senior group.

Personal life 
Kimberly took up the sport at age 7, she practised athletics but after watching some girls with so much flexibility she enrolled in rhythmic gymnastics. She says the most influential people in her career are her parents and her coaches.

Career 
Salazar debuted at the 2017 Junior Pan American Championships taking 10th place in the All-Around, 8th place with hoop, 16th with ball, 13th with clubs and 17th with ribbon. In 2019 she competed at the 1st Junior World Championships in Moscow, competing with rope and ribbon and placing 52nd and 28th.

In 2022 she was included into the national senior group, debuting at the World Cup in Portimão, being 4th in the All-Around and winning two historical medals, the first in the circuit for the country: bronze with 5 hoops and gold with 3 ribbons and 2 balls. A week later, in Pesaro, they took 7th place in the All-Around and 5th in both event finals. In July she competed at the Pan American Championships in Rio de Janeiro, winning silver in the All-Around and with 5 hoops and gold with 3 ribbons and 2 balls. A month later she was in Cluj-Napoca with the group for the last World Cup of the year, ending 4th in the All-Around and with 5 hoops as well as 6th with 3 ribbons and 2 balls. In September Kimberly represented Mexico along Dalia Alcocer, Nicole Cejudo, Sofia Flores and Adirem Tejeda at the World Championships in Sofia, taking 6th place in the All-Around, 6th with 5 hoops and 8th with 3 ribbons and 2 balls.

Achievements 

 Part of the first group that was awarded a medal in the World Cup circuit when she won bronze in Portimão in 2022.
 Part of the first group that was awarded a gold medal in the World Cup circuit in Portimão in 2022.

References 

2004 births
Living people
Mexican rhythmic gymnasts
People from Xalapa
Sportspeople from Veracruz